The Cloutier river (in French: rivière Cloutier) flows in the municipalities of Sainte-Apolline-de-Patton, Notre-Dame-du-Rosaire, Cap-Saint-Ignace, in the Montmagny Regional County Municipality, in the administrative region of Chaudière-Appalaches, in Quebec, in Canada.

The Cloutier river is a tributary of the southwest shore of the Bras Saint-Nicolas, which flows on the southeast shore of the rivière du Sud (Montmagny); the latter flows north-east to the south shore of the St. Lawrence River.

Geography 
The main neighboring watersheds of the Cloutier river are:
 north side: St. Lawrence River, Bras Saint-Nicolas, Inconnue River;
 east side: Bras Saint-Nicolas, Méchant Pouce River;
 south side: rivière du Sud (Montmagny), Fraser River, Alick River;
 west side: rivière des Perdrix, rivière du Sud (Montmagny).

The Cloutier river "has its source on the northern slope of the Notre Dame Mountains, in the municipality of Sainte-Apolline-de-Patton. Several branches of mountain and forest streams feed the head of the Cloutier river.

  towards the north by pronouncing a curve towards the west, in Sainte-Apolline-de-Patton, to the limit of Notre-Dame-du-Rosaire;
  northward, up to the limit of the townships of Ashburton (Notre-Dame-du-Rosaire) and Bourdages (Sainte-Apolline-de-Patton);
  northeasterly, up to the limit between Sainte-Apolline-de-Patton and Cap-Saint-Ignace;
  by forming a loop towards the north in Cap-Saint-Ignace, up to the limit of Sainte-Apolline-de-Patton;
  northeasterly, up to its confluence.

The Cloutier river flows on the southwest bank of the Bras Saint-Nicolas. This confluence is located upstream of the "Great lock" and downstream of the mouth of the Méchant Pouce River.

Toponymy 
The toponym Rivière Cloutier was formalized on December 5, 1968, at the Commission de toponymie du Québec.

See also 

 List of rivers of Quebec

References 

Rivers of Chaudière-Appalaches
Montmagny Regional County Municipality